Fenton High School is a public high school located in Fenton, Michigan, United States. In 2008 the school received International Baccalaureate (IB) Authorization. The high school has over 1,200 students.

Athletics
Until 1968, Fenton High School competed in the County B League. The school then joined the Metro League.

Notable alumni
Kenny Allen (class of 2012), NCAA player for the Austin Peay Governors Football; former University of Michigan placekicker and punter
William I. Cargo, diplomat who served as the United States Ambassador to Nepal and Director of Policy Planning
Myles Jury, wrestler and professional mixed martial arts fighter
Jill Ann Weatherwax (class of 1988), model and singer; murdered in 1998.

References

External links

Educational institutions established in 1969
Public high schools in Michigan
Schools in Genesee County, Michigan
1969 establishments in Michigan